Dibutyl maleate is an organic compound with the formula (CHCO2Bu)2 (Bu = butyl). It is the diester of the unsaturated dicarboxylic acid maleic acid. It is a colorless oily liquid, although impure samples can appear yellow.

Preparation 
Dibutyl maleate can be prepared by the reaction of maleic acid anhydride and 1-butanol in presence of p-toluenesulfonic acid.

Uses 
Dibutyl maleate is mainly used as a plasticizer for aqueous dispersions of copolymers with vinyl acetate and as an intermediate in the preparation of other chemical compounds. With the invention of polyaspartic technology the material found another use. In this situation,  an amine is reacted with a dialkyl maleate - usually diethyl maleate but also dibutyl maleate may be used- utilizing the Michael addition reaction. The resulting products, polyaspartic esters  products are then used in coatings, adhesives, sealants and elastomers.

See also
 Diethyl maleate
 Dimethyl maleate

References 

Maleate esters
Plasticizers